Konstanty Gorski or Górski (1868–1934) was a Polish painter and illustrator, born in a partitioned Poland which was deprived of independence. Gorski studied painting at the Moscow school of fine arts, and at the Petersburg academy. After 1889 he continued his studies in France, Italy and Munich. Gorski returned to his occupied homeland in 1895 and settled in Warsaw, where he became active in the local artistic circle. His paintings, strongly based in the late 19th century aesthetic ideals of realism, consists of numerous portraits, patriotic themes of regional nature, and historical scenes. As the illustrator, Gorski cooperated with the Polish language periodicals such as Wędrowiec (the Wanderer), Tygodnik Ilustrowany weekly, and Tygodnik Polski (the Polish Weekly). Gorski died 15 years after Poland's return to independence.

References

External links

1868 births
1934 deaths
19th-century Polish painters
19th-century Polish male artists
20th-century Polish painters
20th-century Polish male artists
Polish male painters